Trisha Ray is an independent producer, screenwriter, filmmaker, actor, editor and charcoal artist.

Trisha comes from a family of scholars, physicians and surgeons who followed art and music as a hobby. After retiring as an ObGyn, her grandfather Dr. Bimal Ray wrote three volumes of encyclopedia in Eastern Classical Music which are used by researchers all around the globe. Her parents practiced theatre after coming back from their work. She is the first in her family to actually drop out of college to intern on film sets to learn production. She is fluent in English, Spanish and Bengali languages.

Trisha is the grandniece of BAFTA nominated actress Karuna Banerjee. and niece of Universal Esperanto Association President Probal Dasgupta.

She and her partner San Banarje have worked in films and plays as kids and founded their production company Lake Camp Productions during their teenage years to support their passion for films. However, while making their first feature film in Houston, when they could not find actors fluent in the film language to realize their complex scripts as there was no proper cinema school in Houston, they decided to train the actors on their own for their films and founded the first Actors Studio in Houston called 'Next Actor Studio' in 2003, that, designed after the Moscow Arts Theatre,  started training actors by different instructors from New York and Austin, and holding film production and commercial spots under one roof. This allowed them to find actors who worked as a unit and together could create many films.

In 2017, Trisha started production of 6 Rounds of Chloe, about 11 year old Chloe's fight to keep her father Dev win his battle against cancer. The film went to floor in February 2018 with actors Eric Roberts, Kamala Lopez, and San Banarje in important roles.

In 2022, Trisha finished the pilot episode of her 8-episode comedy series RECAST starring Lorelei Linklater, Eric Roberts Pooja Batra, San Banarje and Harry S. Murphy, and is getting ready to shoot the entire season in Houston.

Films 

From the age of 6, Trisha was a regular at her father's theatre rehearsals and enjoyed reading the lines of missing actors. She was cast by her father in many of his productions. He was her first acting coach who taught her Stanislavsky and Brecht, made her read Chekhov, Tolstoy, Dostoevsky and other literature that he was fond of. Although she was expected to follow the footsteps of her family members and become a doctor, she knew she would be happy only if she was writing or pursuing theatre.

During her freshman year, while in California working at a printing press, Trisha used her free time to complete her first feature-length screenplay 'Hola Armando' and decided to quit school to pursue film production. She started interning for different production companies and learned every aspect of film production from being on set as a runner or production assistant, editor's help, demonstrator of new software and technologies at mall showrooms, until she was hired by a television network as an in-house producer.

It was her experimental feature 'Flipped' that taught her a great deal about filmmaking. She was the only crew while her friends and family were cast in different roles. Due to lack of budget, she couldn't afford a sound recordist, so she dubbed the entire film and designed the sound alone. Although she refused to show it to anyone except lead actor San Banarje, the film became equivalent to several years of school for her.

In 2003, when Trisha and San tried to make a feature film called "Death, Diary and a Motel" but failed due to not having access to the kind of actors they were looking for. That's when they started their actor's studio called 'Next Actor Studio' to form a team of professional actors who, like them, would passionately pursue art for the sake of fulfillment and not just commercial benefit. They started making several shorts with the new actors and were soon able to start a program called "First Cut" where different filmmakers of the studio will present the first cut of their works to the audience and receive feedback to get it ready for festivals.

In 2007, Trisha directed her first Christian film 'Federal Case' under the banner of Boat Angels Family Film. The film written by screenwriter and evangelist Brian Stewart, was shot in Mexico and Texas and produced by San Banarje. The three of them still work together and currently making their series 'Orphan Train' with Indian actress Mahie Gill and Spanish actress Andrea Guasch.

In winter 2009, Trisha and San wrote a psychological thriller titled Bodhisattva, with Dadasaheb Phalke winner Soumitra Chatterjee in the title role. Trisha wanted to play the role of Maya, the disturbed daughter of the thespian.
However director San Banarje was not convinced by Trisha's performance at the rehearsals and gave her the first day of shoot to prove herself, while looking for other actors to replace her on the second day. Her first day of shoot was opposite Soumitra Chatterjee who was playing her father Bodhisattva. To prepare for the role, she followed the Stanislavski System, with minimal contact with only her colleagues, and cutting communications with everyone else until the picture wrapped. After her first scene was shot, director San Banarje was excited by her performance and applauded her for her dedication. The entire film was shot in the home of Trisha's mother who stayed in one room with their dog until the day's shoot was over.

In 2013, she wrote the thriller "The Shadow Behind You", which was directed by her writing partner San Banarje. This was followed by the 2013 Fall film 'Artisse' written by Brian Stewart, that she directed. In winter 2013, she co-produced, edited and did the casting for the film 'Sex, Marriage and Infidelity' for debuting director-writer Richard Finger, a columnist for Forbes with actors Charlie O'Connell, Shannon Tweed, and her daughter with Gene Simmons, Sophie Simmons. All three films were released in 2014.

In 2015, Trisha cast and produced the feature A Curry on an American Plate under the banner of Next Actor Films that she had co-written with the film's director and co-producer San Banarje. The film starred Rick Fox, Charlie O'Connell and Andrea Guasch along with several students of Next Actor Film School, an Actor's Studio that they run in Houston.

In 2015, Trisha wrote the screenplay of a feature '6 Rounds of Chloe' about a teenage daughter struggling to save her father from cancer. The script was written with director Cynthia Mort and actress Melanie Mayron's daughter Olivia Mayron-Mort in mind. However, she could not find anyone to invest in the film, and shelved it.

In 2015 December, Trisha started filming Orphan Train for Boat Angel Family Films with Actress Mahie Gill. The film later turned into a series and released its pilot in 2016 at Niff Houston International Film Festival. In 2017, Spanish Disney actress Andrea Guasch joined the team as a leading lady.

In 2016, Boat Angel came in as a co-producer for '6 Rounds of Chloe' and Trisha restarted her production of the film in 2017 with a brand new revision of the script, with actress and activist Kamala Lopez and San Banarje in lead roles and cast a talented child actress Alexandra Goel as an 11 year old Chloe. Actor Eric Roberts was cast in the role of oncologist Dr. Bing and production started in 2018. Trisha and San took turns to shoot the film, that spanned over an entire year.

In 2020, Trisha and San started their TV series RECAST, based on their comedy feature film 'Bleep Love,' shot in 2006. The show, that was to shoot in Los Angeles, had to be delayed due to coronavirus, and filming started in November 2020 in Houston.

Filmography 

|}

References

External links 

American film directors
American women film directors
Living people
American women screenwriters
American Hindus
American people of Indian descent
Spanish-language film directors
English-language film directors
Year of birth missing (living people)
21st-century American women